George Samuel Konik (May 4, 1937 – October 21, 2016) was a Canadian-born American professional ice hockey player. He played 52 games in the National Hockey League with the Pittsburgh Penguins during the 1967–68 season and 54 games in the World Hockey Association with the Minnesota Fighting Saints during the 1972–73 season. Internationally he played for the American national team at the 1970 and 1971 World Championships.

Career
Konik was a star on the University of Denver hockey team which won the NCAA hockey championship in 1960 and 1961. He signed a professional contract with the New York Rangers after that but did not make his NHL debut until 1967–68 after the expansion Pittsburgh Penguins traded for his rights. Konik made 52 appearances as a versatile role player for the Penguins that season, but drifted back to the minor professional leagues after that.

Konik (who settled in Minnesota in 1964) eventually became a naturalized American citizen and joined the United States national team for the 1970 and 1971 Ice Hockey World Championship tournaments; he was named best defenceman in 1970. Konik came out of retirement in 1972/73 to play a final season of major league pro hockey for the WHA Minnesota Fighting Saints before leaving hockey for good. Konik died in the morning of October 21, 2016; his death was announced later that day by the Penguins' official Twitter account.

Business career
After hockey Konik founded George Konik Associates, a technical staffing firm in 1974 and Maple Leaf Travel in 1982.

Career statistics

Regular season and playoffs

International

Awards and honors

Central Professional Hockey League First All-Star Team (1967) 
1970 World Ice Hockey Championships Pool B (WEC-B) All-Star Team (1970) 
Named Best Defenseman at WEC-B (1970)
Named to WCHA Top 50 Players in 50 Years
Inducted into the Manitoba Hockey Hall of Fame (2011)
January 31, 1968 - George Konik scores on the first penalty shot in franchise history at St. Louis beating Glenn Hall in a 9-4 Penguins loss.

References

External links
 
 George Konik Associates

1937 births
2016 deaths
AHCA Division I men's ice hockey All-Americans
American men's ice hockey left wingers
Baltimore Clippers players
Canadian emigrants to the United States
Canadian ice hockey left wingers
Denver Pioneers men's ice hockey players
Flin Flon Bombers players
Ice hockey people from Manitoba
Los Angeles Blades (WHL) players
Minnesota Fighting Saints players
Minnesota Rangers players
NCAA men's ice hockey national champions
Pittsburgh Penguins players
Seattle Totems (WHL) players
Sportspeople from Flin Flon